Tikhobrazov (feminine Tikhobrazova) is a surname of Russian origin. Notable people with the surname include:

Nicolas Tikhobrazoff (1946–2022), French painter and radio host
Nikolai Tikhobrazov (1818–1874), Russian painter

Russian-language surnames